"Yes Tonight Josephine" was a popular music song from 1957. It was written by Winfield Scott and Dorothy Goodman, and was a hit single for Johnnie Ray.

Chart performance
Ray's recording was produced by Mitch Miller, and in the US, peaked at number 12 on the Most Played by Jockeys chart.  Outside the US, "Yes Tonight Josephine" gave Ray his third and final number 1 hit in the UK Singles Chart. The single first entered the UK Singles Chart on 10 May 1957, and peaked at number 1 for three weeks in June. The original record was only available as a 78rpm disc. Altogether it spent 16 weeks on the chart.

Cover versions
A cover version by British rockabilly revival band The Jets peaked at number 25 in the UK Singles Chart in 1981.

References

1957 songs
1957 singles
UK Singles Chart number-one singles
Johnnie Ray songs
Songs written by Winfield Scott (songwriter)